Robert Heppener (9 August 1925 in Amsterdam – 25 August 2009 in Bergen), also known as Bob Heppener, was a Dutch composer. He was among the most important Dutch composers of the 20th century.

Early life and education 
Heppener was born in Amsterdam on 9 August 1925. He studied composition with Bertus van Lier and piano with Jan Odé and Johan van den Boogert at the Amsterdam Conservatory.

Career
Heppener taught piano and music theory at the Rotterdam Music School. After leaving Rotterdam, he went to Amsterdam, where he taught music theory and composition at the Muzieklyceum. In his later years, he taught composition at the Conservatory of Music in Maastricht.

Death
Heppener passed away on 25 August 2009, at the age of 84.

References

1925 births
2009 deaths
20th-century classical composers
Academic staff of the Conservatorium van Amsterdam
Conservatorium van Amsterdam alumni
Dutch male classical composers
Dutch classical composers
Musicians from Amsterdam
20th-century Dutch male musicians